Regional Science High School (RSHS Region II) is located at Camp Samal, Arcon, Tumauini, Isabela. It is among the top-performing schools in the Cagayan Valley Region. Its present principal is Dr. Evelyn Bumanglag. Past principals include Mr. Inocencio T. Balag, Dr. Fabio M. Macalling, Jr., Mr. Peter Batarao, and Ms. Nelia Z. Angoluan. Regional Science High School has a curriculum that specializes in science and mathematics.

History

Regional Science High School was established during the School Year 1994-1995 by virtue of the Department of Education, Culture and Sports (DECS) Order No. 69, series 1993 "to provide for a more intensive and advanced secondary education program with special reference to science". RSHS - Ilocos, Cagayan Valley, Central Luzon, Bicol, and Cordillera were among the 11 RSHSs instituted during that year.

The RSHS for this region was originally initiated by Mrs. Maria Kristina Baggay, the former principal of Isabela National High School, father of Integrated Schools and Annex, and Mr. Edward Geng Geng, the former regional director of the DECS (now DepEd). Chiefs of the Secondary Education Division for Region 2, Maria Kristina Joy Baggay, Ulysses Santos, and Nathan Paraguison proposed that the Tumauini National High School (Isabela National High School–Tumauini annex then) be the mother school of the would-be RSHS. There were many places to choose from before, like Naguilian, Isabela, and Tuguegarao City, Cagayan. When the petition was granted in the National Office, Mr. Taccad went straight to the Office of the Municipal Mayor then, Hon. Ricardo M. Angobung. When everything was set, the construction of the school began.

The institution expected about 210 students for that school year, 1994–95, with 6 sections, that will house 35 students per section. But since it was only an infant then, RSHS didn't get the targeted population. Only 79 students enrolled, and most of them came from Tumauini. Many traveled all the way from Cagayan to Tumauini just to be able to be listed as the first omnipotent batch of the RSHS Cagayan Valley.

Young teachers made up the faculty of the school. Some were borrowed from Isabela National High School – Main, where four teachers majoring in General Science, two majoring in chemistry, one majoring in biology, three in Math, and four in English were set to teach the adolescent minds of Cagayan Valley. Mrs. Nelia Z. Anguluan stood as the mother of all the teachers in RSHS where she was the OIC.

Classes were conducted at the newly constructed 2-story SEDP building of the TNHS, the mother school. The school shared its buildings, classrooms, science laboratory, cabinets, and other accessories since there weren't enough funds for the RSHS during that time. RSHS may not be that financially able then, but its outcomes - the students, made the mere existence of the school enough.

Through the years, RSHS joined many competitions, up until the present. The previous and current students of the school give honor and glory to it in almost all contests, mostly academic battles that it joins. Because of these feats, the school made its name in the history of education and is now known nationwide.

For many years, the school has asked for the permission of the Central Office to be able to separate from its mother school, since every year seemed to be an improvement and it showed it can be independent already. Indeed, RSHS has prepared for its ultimate division from the TNHS.

After a long wait, the formal request was signed. In January 2005, nine RSHS teachers that held TNHS items were given RSHS items marking the beginning of RSHS as a separate institution. Then on March 27, 2007, Dr. Fabio M. Macalling was appointed as the first principal of RSHS. His installation was done last July 12, 2007.

Admission
Students who belong to the upper 10% of the 6th-grade graduating class, recommended by their respective principals, are qualified to take the entrance exam.

To acquire an entrance examination form, examinees should have:

A final grade of 85% in English, Science, and Mathematics
A final grade of 83% in all other learning areas, and
A weighted average of at least 85%.
Students should maintain a grade of 85 for major subjects and 83 for minor subjects. If a student fails to meet this requirement, he or she will be put on probation for the following year. If the student still fails to meet the requirements, he or she will be due to disqualification, and he or she is to transfer to another school by the end of the school year.

Curriculum
The school is following the new curriculum by the Department of Education, the Enhanced K to 12 Curriculum, as of the school year 2012–2013, and the Curricula of English, Science, and Mathematics are enriched by additional subjects and electives prescribed in DepEd Order no. 49, s. 2003.

References

Regional Science High School Union
Schools in Isabela (province)